The Mausolea and Monuments Trust is a charity for the "protection and preservation of mausolea and funerary monuments situated in Great Britain and Ireland." The trust was founded in 1997 by the architectural historian Jill Allibone (1932–1998). Tim Knox, then the director of the Soane Museum and the trust's first chairman, described it as “the dottiest conservation cause in the land”.

The trust has responsibility for six mausolea:

 The Bateman Mausoleum, Morley, Derbyshire
 The Heathcote Mausoleum, Hursley, Hampshire
 The Wynne Ellis Mausoleum, Whitstable, Kent
 The Nash Mausoleum, Farningham, Kent
 The Guise Mausoleum, Elmore, Gloucestershire
 The Boileau Mausoleum, Ketteringham, Norfolk

The trust publishes a regular journal titled Mausolus, and researches and maintains a gazetteer of mausolea in Great Britain and Ireland.

References

External links 
 The Mausolea & Monuments Trust website

Charities based in London
Architecture in the United Kingdom
Architecture in Ireland
1997 establishments in the United Kingdom
Funerary art
Mausoleums in the United Kingdom